The Lao League 1, known for sponsorship reasons as the Pepsi Lao League 1, is a football league representing the sport's highest level in Laos. The league is composed of siz clubs for the 2023 season.

Format
Over the course of a season, which runs from February to September, each team plays against the others three times in a triple round-robin. Three points are awarded for a win, one for a draw and zero for a loss. The teams are ranked in the league table by points gained, then goal difference, then goals scored and then their head-to-head record for that season.

Team and stadiums 
A total of 9 teams participated in the 2023 Lao League 1 season.
Note: Table lists in alphabetical order.

Champions

1990: Lao Army FC (Vientiane)
1991: Lao Army FC (Vientiane)
1992: Lao Army FC (Vientiane)
1993: Savannakhet (Savannakhet) / Lao Army FC (Vientiane)
1994: Lao Army FC (Vientiane)
1995: Pakse (Pakse) / Education Team
1996: Lao Army FC (Vientiane)
1997: Sayaboury (Sayaboury) / Lao Army FC (Vientiane)
1998: Khammouan Province Team
2000: Vientiane Municipality (national games)
2001: Lao Bank FC
2002: MCTPC FC (Ministry of Communication, Transportation and Construction)
2003: MCTPC FC (Ministry of Communication, Transportation and Construction)
2004: MCTPC FC (Ministry of Communication, Transportation and Construction)
2005: Vientiane FC
2006: Vientiane FC
2007: Lao-American College FC
2008: Lao Army FC (Vientiane)
2009: Not held
2010: Lao Bank FC
2011: YOTHA FC
2012: Lao Police Club
2013: SHB Champasak
2014: Hoang Anh Attapeu
2015: Lao Toyota F.C.
2016: Lanexang United
2017: Lao Toyota F.C.
2018: Lao Toyota F.C.
2019: Lao Toyota F.C.
2020: Lao Toyota F.C.
2021: Cancelled
2022 : Young Elephants
2023 :To be determined

Titles by club

Top scorers

References

External links
 Official website
 Weltfussballarchiv
 Übersicht auf rsssf.com
 Liga auf fifa.com
 Spielzeit 2018 auf soccerway.com

 
1990 establishments in Laos
1
Top level football leagues in Asia
Sports leagues established in 1990